Events from the year 2005 in Pakistan.

Incumbents

Federal government
President: Pervez Musharraf 
Prime Minister: Shaukat Aziz
Chief Justice: Nazim Hussain Siddiqui (until 29 June), Iftikhar Muhammad Chaudhry

Governors
Governor of Balochistan – Owais Ahmed Ghani
Governor of Khyber Pakhtunkhwa – Iftikhar Hussain Shah (until 15 March); Khalilur Rehman (starting 15 March)
Governor of Punjab – Khalid Maqbool 
Governor of Sindh – Ishrat-ul-Ibad Khan

Events

May
1 May – Japanese Prime Minister Junichiro Koizumi leaves Pakistan after two days of talks with President Pervez Musharraf and Prime Minister Shaukat Aziz – the first by a Japanese PM for five years. At the conclusion of the trip a joint declaration between the two nations announces their commitment to cooperate.

October
5 October – Perpetrators of the racially motivated murder of Glasgow teenager Kriss Donald, extradited to the United Kingdom to face trial in a one-off agreement negotiated with Pakistan.
8 October – The 7.6  Kashmir earthquake strikes with a maximum Mercalli intensity of VIII (Severe), leaving 86,000–87,351 people dead, 69,000–75,266 injured, and 2.8 million homeless.
10 October – The president of Pakistan appeals for international help following the earthquake, saying the country cannot deal with crisis on its own.

November
 3 November – Pakistan announces that the official death toll from the quake is over 73,000.

December
 England complete their tour of Pakistan with a victory against the Pakistan cricket team at Rawalpindi.

See also
2004 in Pakistan
2005 in Pakistani television
2006 in Pakistan
List of Pakistani films of 2005
Other events of 2005
Timeline of Pakistani history

References

 
Pakistan
Years of the 21st century in Pakistan
2000s in Pakistan